Hvammstangi is an Icelandic village in the north-west part of the country, on Vatnsnes peninsula, situated on the Miðfjörður.

It is the most densely populated area in the West Húnaþing County, with a population of about 580 people .

Overview
Hvammstangi is an important service center for the surrounding area. It is a regional provider of education, and it has been an important trading center since 1846. The town has a growing tourism and administration industry. The fishing industry (providing mainly shrimp) is also very important to the town's economy. The town also owns the largest textile factory in Iceland. The town is also home to the Icelandic Seal Center.

Athletics
Hvammstangi has basketball team Kormákur karfa who compete in the 3. deild karla the lowest division of Icelandic basketball.

References

Populated places in Northwestern Region (Iceland)